Załuski is a neighbourhood, and an area of the Municipal Information System, in the city of Warsaw, Poland, located within the district of Włochy.

History 
In the 16th century, the village, which was located in place of modern Załuski, was owned by the Górka family of the Łodzia coat of arms heraldic clan. After the name of the family, the village was called Górki. In 1528, the village had 2 lans of land, which was around 34 hectares (0.34 km2 or 0.13 square miles). Between 1655 and 1956, during the Deluge, an invasion of Swedish Empire on Polish–Lithuanian Commonwealth, the village had been entirely burned down, and ceased to exist. In the second half of the 17th century, in its place had been build a folwark-type settlement, called Załuski, after the name of the new owner. In the 18th century, Arnold Anastazy Byszewski become new owner of the village, adding to his large land estate. In the 19th century, near Załuski was created another village, known as Kalinowo, and both village eventually merged, with combined settlement being called Załuski. In 1870, in the village were 13 houses.

Between 1883 and 1890, the Fort V "Włochy" had been build between Salomea and Załuski, as part of the series of fortifications of the Warsaw Fortress, build around Warsaw by the Russian Empire. In 1909, it was decided to decommission and demolish the fortifications of the Warsaw Fortress, due to the high costs of their maintenance, and as such the Fort V had been partially demolished in 1913.

By 20th century, the village had been owned by the Krzemiński family, of the Prus III coat of arms herladic clan, which sold portion of Załuski to the families of Ryszczak, Koch, and Wąsik. In the 1920s, the village begun expanding, including to the eastern side of the Krakowska Avenue. However its expansion had been restricted in 1934, due to the founding of the Warsaw-Okęcie Airport (now known as Warsaw Chopin Airport) near by. The presence of the airport, brought the height restrictions to the new buildings, forbidding constructions higher than 7 metres (23 feet). Due to the construction of the airport, portion of Załuski, located at the eastern side of the Krakowska Avenue had been bulldozed down.

On 5 May 1951, Załuski had been incorporated into the city of Warsaw.

Nature 
In the area are located Załuski Clay Pits, two small man-made lakes, made in the clay pit.

Citations

Notes

References 

Zaluski, Warsaw